Kaaval is a 2015 Indian Tamil-language action film written and directed by Nagendran R., based on a true story and produced by Punnagai Poo Gheetha and Philip Sheetal. It stars Vimal, Samuthirakani and Punnagai Poo Gheetha. The film, which was initially titled Nee Yellam Nalla Varuvada, began production in 2013 and released on 26 June 2015

Plot
Chandrasekar (Samuthirakani) is an honest police officer who is given an opportunity to encounter the deadliest don who is responsible for all the murders that are happening in Tamil Nadu. But during the mission, he loses Alwin Sudan, one of his most intelligent encounter specialists. Later, he realizes that their carefully planned operation was leaked to the rivals by Anbarasu (Vimal), the son of a corrupt constable (M. S. Bhaskar). Chandrasekar sketches a plan to encounter the don through Anbarasu.

Cast

 Vimal as Anbarasu
 Samuthirakani as  Inspector Chandrasekhar
 Punnagai Poo Gheetha as Amrutha
 M. S. Bhaskar as Anbarasu's father
 Namo Narayana as Narayana
 Imman Annachi as Police
 Ashwin Raja as Anbarasu's friend
 Stunt Silva
 Singamuthu as Police 
 TSK
 Senthi Kumari as Anbarasu's mother
 Venkat Subha
 Sneha in a cameo appearance
 Mannara Chopra in an item number

Production
Nagendran, a former assistant of Seeman and Susi Ganesan announced in September 2013 that he would make his directorial debut with the project titled as Nee Yellam Nalla Varuvada named after the dialogue spoken by Santhanam. Vimal, Samuthirakani recruited to play prominent characters along with Punnagai Poo Geetha, producer of this film playing the lead actress, M. S. Bhaskar, Singamuthu, Imman Annachi and Kumki Ashwin playing supporting roles. Priyanka Chopra's cousin Mannara (Barbie Handa) was selected to perform an item number.

G. V. Prakash Kumar was signed to produce the music, N. K. Ekambaram to handle the cinematography and Praveen-Srikanth were signed as the editors. Silva, Na. Muthukumar and Videsh were chosenas the stunt coordinator, lyricist and art director, respectively. The film which was reported to be based on a real-life incident started its filming in Pondicherry, which was held in Tamil Nadu and Kerala for 60 days. Nagendran revealed that the film was based on M. Phil study which revolves 34,712 murders took place from 1995 to 2014. In April 2015, the film's title was changed into Kaaval as many people who saw the film, including promising directors, top industry personnel and police officials felt that the film deserved a more serious and purposeful title.

Soundtrack 
The soundtrack was composed by G. V. Prakash Kumar with background score composed by Dharan Kumar.

Release
The film was given a "U/A" certificate by Central Board of Film Certification. The film was initially slated to release on June 19 but eventually released on June 26.

Critical reception
The film received mixed reviews from critics. Times of India rated the film 2 out of 5 and stated that "The problem with Kaaval is that it offers nothing new in terms of story and presentation. Almost every development feels been there done that". Gauthaman Baskaran of Hindustan Times rated it 1.5 out of 5 and wrote "In the end, the work turns out to be yet another addition to the list of very average movies". Behindwoods wrote "To sum up Kaaval, the cops vs contract killers theme is interesting and it has some good moments when Samuthirakani is in charge. But overall, the film doesn't create the desired impact". Sify wrote, "Kaaval is a pucca mass masala entertainer with action, comedy, romance, sentiments and other elements associated with big-hero films. But it manages to entertain only at few places and most of the time; the clichéd execution dilutes the intensity".

However Indiaglitz praised the film stating "The film apart from its shortcomings deserves praise for its content and chilling presentation backed by deep analysis". The New Indian Express wrote, "Fairly engaging in its story telling style, Kaaval seems to be a debutant director's tribute to the police force", calling it a "gripping tale about crime and retribution" and further wrote, .

References

External links 
 

Indian action films
2010s Tamil-language films
2015 action films
Fictional portrayals of the Tamil Nadu Police
2015 films
Films scored by G. V. Prakash Kumar